Lobón is a municipality located in the province of Badajoz, Extremadura, Spain. According to the 2012 census (INE), the municipality has a population of 2,869 inhabitants.

Apart from the town of Lobón itself, the other main population centre is Guadajira (population: 650; 2017).

References

Municipalities in the Province of Badajoz